The 2016 Castrol Edge Townsville 400 was a motor racing event for Supercars, held on the weekend of 8 to 10 July 2016. The event was held at the Townsville Street Circuit in Townsville, Queensland, and consisted of two races of 200 kilometres in length. It was the seventh event of fourteen in the 2016 International V8 Supercars Championship and hosted Races 14 and 15 of the season. The event was the eighth running of the Townsville 400.

Triple Eight Race Engineering had a successful weekend with two of its drivers, Jamie Whincup and Shane van Gisbergen, finishing first and second in Race 14. Van Gisbergen won Race 15 while Whincup finished fourth. As a result, Van Gisbergen moved into second place in the championship, 53 points behind Whincup. Defending series champion Mark Winterbottom finished third in both races, while James Courtney scored his first podium finish since the Clipsal 500 Adelaide by finishing second in Race 15.

Report

Background 
Due to injuries sustained in a crash at the previous event in Darwin, Lee Holdsworth was unable to take part in the event. His team, Team 18, had originally planned to replace Holdsworth with its endurance co-driver Karl Reindler, however this change was abandoned when it was found that the team's chassis could not be repaired in time for the event. The team instead made a deal with Dunlop Series driver Kurt Kostecki, who would race for the team in his own chassis.

Tim Slade ran a one-off livery at the event, with major sponsorship from Alliance Truck Parts. His team, Brad Jones Racing, also announced a new technical alliance with American engineering firm Pratt & Miller in order to improve its understanding of its cars. DJR Team Penske continued its sponsor rotation, running a Hog's Breath livery on Fabian Coulthard's car, while Nissan Motorsport ran a one-off livery on Michael Caruso's car to promote a new deal between Nissan and A-League team Melbourne City. Lucas Dumbrell Motorsport took part with mostly blank cars following a failed sponsorship deal between the team and controversial Gold Coast businessman Travers Beynon.

One week prior to the event, it was announced that the Townsville 400 would remain a part of the Supercars Championship calendar until 2019.

Jamie Whincup entered the event as the championship leader, 30 points ahead of his teammate Craig Lowndes, while Scott McLaughlin was third, a further 15 points behind.

Practice 
Two forty-minute practice sessions were held on Friday afternoon. The first was topped by David Reynolds, who set a time of 1:12.8697. Chaz Mostert and Will Davison were second and third fastest respectively. The three Triple Eight Race Engineering drivers all made mistakes during the session, with Lowndes spinning at Turn 2 and Shane van Gisbergen going off twice at Turn 6. Whincup hit the wall on the exit of Turn 3 at the end of the session, causing significant damage to his car. Whincup recovered to set the fastest time in the second session, with Mostert and Davison again finishing second and third.

Qualifying – Race 14 
Qualifying for Race 14 was held on Saturday afternoon and consisted of a single 15-minute session. Whincup took his first pole position of the season, setting a time of 1:12.1443 to be fastest ahead of Van Gisbergen and James Courtney. Nick Percat was given a two-place grid penalty for blocking Aaren Russell on the run into Turn 7.

Race 14 
Race 14 was held on Saturday afternoon and the race regulations required each car to take on at least 120 litres of fuel during the race. The top three maintained their positions at the start while Davison moved up from sixth to fourth. McLaughlin and Dale Wood made contact on the opening lap, causing damage to McLaughlin's car and forcing him to pit for repairs. He later rejoined the race two laps off the lead. On lap 2, Slade was spun by Rick Kelly at Turn 11. Both drivers stopped on the track and Percat ran into the back of Kelly, who was given a drive-through penalty for causing the incident. Cameron Waters was the first driver to make a pit stop, doing so on lap 9. Courtney made his first pit stop on lap 13, followed by Van Gisbergen on lap 14 and Whincup on lap 16. Following the first round of pit stops, Whincup led from Van Gisbergen, Courtney, Mostert and Winterbottom.

The second round of pit stops began on lap 35 when Slade and James Moffat completed their second stops. Whincup and Courtney stopped on lap 40, while Van Gisbergen stayed out for an extra lap. Van Gisbergen was then engaged in a close battle with Mostert, who had moved ahead of Courtney. Mostert passed Van Gisbergen on lap 47 before the latter was able to take back second place on lap 55. Kostecki hit the wall at Turn 10 on lap 51, leaving his car with damage that would take his team several laps to repair. Mostert was passed by Winterbottom on lap 59 before the safety car was deployed on lap 64 to allow Percat's car to be retrieved. Percat had suffered a steering failure and he hit the wall before stopping at Turn 7. With Van Gisbergen having to pass the lapped cars of Tim Blanchard and Chris Pither when the race restarted on lap 69, Whincup was able to win by over three seconds. Winterbottom finished third ahead of Mostert, while Davison took fifth place from Courtney on the run to the finish line. Courtney's teammate Garth Tander finished seventh after starting from 20th. The result saw Whincup extend his championship lead to 83 points, with Van Gisbergen moving into second place ahead of Winterbottom.

Qualifying – Race 15 
Qualifying for Race 15 consisted of a 20-minute session on Sunday morning followed by a top ten shootout for the fastest ten qualifiers in the afternoon. Van Gisbergen set the fastest time in the qualifying session ahead of Whincup and Winterbottom. Davison, Lowndes, McLaughlin, Mostert, Reynolds, Scott Pye and Tander also progressed to the top ten shootout. Jason Bright made contact with Moffat at Turn 2, damaging the latter's steering. Bright was found guilty of careless driving and was given a three-place grid penalty for Race 15. Kostecki was given a two-place grid penalty for impeding Slade.

The top ten shootout saw each of the ten drivers complete one flying lap each, in reverse order of their qualifying positions. Tander was the first driver to complete his lap and set a time of 1:13.1274, which was narrowly beaten by Pye. Reynolds improved on Pye's time by nearly half a second, setting a time of 1:12.6286, which Mostert and McLaughlin were both unable to beat. Lowndes then went fastest with a time of 1:12.5102, before Winterbottom eclipsed this by one tenth of a second. Neither Whincup nor Van Gisbergen were able to match Winterbottom's time and they qualified third and fourth respectively, behind Lowndes.

Race 15 
Race 15 was held on Sunday afternoon and the race regulations required each car to take on at least 120 litres of fuel during the race. Reynolds made the best start and moved from fifth to second in the opening lap, behind Winterbottom and ahead of Whincup and Van Gisbergen. Slade and Todd Kelly both entered the pit lane at the end of the first lap after making contact with each other and Rick Kelly at the start and incurring damage. After locking a brake and damaging one of his front tyres, Van Gisbergen was the first driver to make a scheduled pit stop, doing so on lap 12. Winterbottom stopped on lap 14, followed by Reynolds one lap later, while Whincup stayed out until lap 24. Running longer on older tyres hurt Whincup's times and he rejoined the race in twelfth place, while Winterbottom continued to lead from Van Gisbergen and Reynolds. Kostecki crashed on lap 30 due to a mechanical failure, leading to the deployment of the safety car and triggering the second round of pit stops.

Winterbottom maintained the lead ahead of Van Gisbergen and Reynolds, while Whincup moved up to fourth place having needed less fuel than other drivers in the second pit stop. The race was restarted on lap 37 and Van Gisbergen took the lead one lap later, passing Winterbottom at the final corner. Percat retired from the race on lap 41 with another steering failure. Triple Eight Race Engineering had fitted the wrong rear tyres on Lowndes' car during his second pit stop and as a result he dropped from sixth place on lap 47 to 17th ten laps later, before stopping for a tyre change on lap 58. The safety car was deployed on lap 62 after Andre Heimgartner stopped on the circuit and most of the drivers outside the top six took the opportunity to stop and fit fresh tyres. The race restarted on lap 65 with Van Gisbergen leading Winterbottom, Whincup, McLaughlin and Reynolds, while Courtney was ninth and the highest placed of those who had stopped.

Courtney passed both Moffat and Tander on lap 65 and he continued to move forwards in the closing laps, passing Whincup for third on lap 69. Van Gisbergen had built enough of a gap to take victory, but Winterbottom was passed by Courtney on the run to the finish line. Whincup and McLaughlin finished fourth and fifth, while sixth through to tenth place were filled by drivers who had taken on new tyres: Waters, Pye, Caruso, Bright and Lowndes. Whincup maintained the championship lead, which was cut to 53 points over Van Gisbergen with Winterbottom a further 22 points behind in third.

Post-race 
The Holden Racing Team was fined A$3000 and penalised 30 Teams' Championship points after a wheel nut rolled across the pit lane in Tander's first pit stop.

Results

Race 14

Qualifying

Race

Race 15

Qualifying

Top Ten Shootout

Race

Championship standings after the event 
 After Race 15 of 29. Only the top five positions are included for both sets of standings.

Drivers' Championship standings

Teams' Championship standings

Notes

References 

Castrol Edge Townsville 400
Castrol Edge Townsville 400